The General Administration of Quality Supervision, Inspection and Quarantine of the People's Republic of China (abbreviated AQSIQ) was a ministerial-level department under the State Council of the People's Republic of China that is in charge of national quality, metrology, entry-exit commodity inspection, entry-exit health quarantine, entry-exit animal and plant quarantine, import-export food safety, certification and accreditation, standardization, as well as administrative law enforcement.

AQSIQ directly administers provincial Entry-Exit Inspection and Quarantine Bureaus and Bureaus of Quality and Technical Supervision.  For example, the Beijing Entry-Exit Inspection and Quarantine Bureau is responsible for collecting health declaration forms, and used thermal imaging to spot passengers with fever due to the 2009 flu pandemic prior to July 16, 2009.

In 2018, the AQSIQ was merged with the newly created State Administration for Market Regulation.

List of heads
 Li Changjiang (April 2001 – September 2008)
 Wang Yong (September 2008 – August 2010)
 Zhi Shuping (August 2010 – March 2018)
 Hou Jianguo served as party secretary from May 2017 to March 2018.

See also
Standardization Administration of China (SAC)
Food safety in China
Chinese protein export contamination
Exit & Entry Permit (Republic of China)

References

External links

Government agencies of China
2007 pet food recalls
2008 Chinese milk scandal
Standards organizations in China
Safety organizations
Food safety organizations
Food safety in China
Medical and health organizations based in China
Regulation in China